Alberta Provincial Highway No. 27, commonly referred to as Highway 27, is an east-west highway in central Alberta, Canada.

Major intersections 
From west to east:

References 

027